Roman Mityukov (born 30 July 2000) is a Swiss swimmer. He competed in the men's 200 metre backstroke at the 2019 World Aquatics Championships.

References

External links
 

2000 births
Living people
Swiss male backstroke swimmers
Place of birth missing (living people)
European Aquatics Championships medalists in swimming
Swimmers at the 2020 Summer Olympics
Olympic swimmers of Switzerland
21st-century Swiss people